Gudō Toshoku (1577–1661) was a Japanese Rinzai school zen monk from the early Tokugawa period. He was a leading figure in the Ōtōkan lineage of the Myōshin-ji, where he led a reform movement to revitalize the practice of Rinzai. He served three times as abbot of Myōshin-ji. Among his leading disciples was Shidō Bunan (1603–1676), from whose line came the great reformer Hakuin Ekaku (1685–1768). The illustrious Zen preacher Bankei Yōtaku earlier in life wanted to meet Gudō and receive confirmation of enlightenment, but narrowly missed seeing him at his Daisen-ji temple in Mino province (today's Gifu prefecture) because the master was visiting up in Edo (Tokyo). Gudō received the posthumous title Daien Hôkan Kokushi (national teacher). He left no written words.

References

Zen Buddhist abbots
Japanese Buddhist clergy
1577 births
1661 deaths
Edo period Buddhist clergy